Yalınkaş is a village in the Tercan District, Erzincan Province, Turkey. The village had a population of 132 in 2021.

The hamlet of Toptaş is attached to the village.

References 

Villages in Tercan District